Ymerbukta is a bay in Oscar II Land at Spitsbergen, Svalbard. The glacier Esmarkbreen debouches into the bay. The bay is separated from Trygghamna by the mountain chain Värmlandryggen.

References

Bays of Spitsbergen